Carina Jonsson (born 15 April 1969) is a Swedish archer. She competed in the women's individual and team events at the 1988 Summer Olympics.

References

External links
 

1969 births
Living people
Swedish female archers
Olympic archers of Sweden
Archers at the 1988 Summer Olympics
People from Nordanstig Municipality
Sportspeople from Gävleborg County
20th-century Swedish women